Colcannon is a traditional Irish dish of mashed potatoes with cabbage.

Description
Colcannon is most commonly made with only four ingredients: potatoes, butter, milk and cabbage (or kale). Irish historian Patrick Weston Joyce defined it as "potatoes mashed with butter and milk, with chopped up cabbage and pot herbs". It can contain other ingredients such as scallions (spring onions), leeks, laverbread, onions and chives. Some recipes substitute cabbage for kale. There are many regional variations of this staple dish. It was a cheap, year-round food. It is often eaten with boiled ham, salt pork or Irish bacon. As a side dish it goes well with corned beef and cabbage.

An Irish Halloween tradition is to serve colcannon with a ring and a thimble hidden in the dish. Prizes of small coins such as threepenny or sixpenny bits were also concealed inside the dish. Other items could include a stick indicating an unhappy marriage, and a rag denoting a life of poverty. The dish champ is similar but made with scallions, butter, and milk. It was traditional to offer a portion of champ to the fairies by placing a dish of colcannon with a spoon at the foot of a hawthorn.

Etymology 
The origin of the word is unclear. The first syllable 'col' is likely to be derived from the Irish 'cál' meaning cabbage. The second syllable may derive from 'ceann-fhionn' meaning a white head (i.e. 'a white head of cabbage') – this usage is also found in the Irish name for a coot, a white-headed bird known as 'cearc cheannan', or 'white-head hen'. In Welsh the name for leek soup is cawl cennin, a phrase combining cawl meaning "soup", "broth" or "gruel", when it is not a reference to the typical Welsh meat and vegetable stew named in full 'cawl Cymreig', with 'cennin', the plural of 'cenhinen', meaning "leeks"..  It is unlikely that this Welsh phrase is the source for the Irish word, because of the differences in pronunciation affecting the vowels, and the great divergence in sense, "mashed potato and cabbage" versus "leek broth".

Song 
The song "Colcannon", also called "The Skillet Pot", is a traditional Irish song that has been recorded by numerous artists, including Mary Black. It begins:
Did you ever eat Colcannon, made from lovely pickled cream?
With the greens and scallions mingled like a picture in a dream.
Did you ever make a hole on top to hold the melting flake
Of the creamy, flavoured butter that your mother used to make?

The chorus:
Yes you did, so you did, so did he and so did I.
And the more I think about it sure the nearer I'm to cry.
Oh, wasn't it the happy days when troubles we had not,
And our mothers made Colcannon in the little skillet pot.

Similar dishes

See also

 List of cabbage dishes
 List of Irish dishes
 List of potato dishes

References

External links

Irish cuisine
Potato dishes
Irish words and phrases
Brassica oleracea dishes
Cabbage dishes
Vegetarian cuisine
National dishes
Saint Patrick's Day food
Halloween food